Mundeu maculicollis is a species of beetle in the family Cerambycidae, the only species in the genus Mundeu.

References

Acanthoderini